Novak Djokovic defeated Borna Ćorić in the final, 6–3, 6–4 to win the singles tennis title at the 2018 Shanghai Masters. It was his record fourth Shanghai Masters title, and 32nd Masters 1000 title overall. He did not lose a single set in the entire tournament.

Roger Federer was the defending champion, but lost to Ćorić in the semifinals.

Seeds
The top eight seeds receive a bye into the second round.

Draw

Finals

Top half

Section 1

Section 2

Bottom half

Section 3

Section 4

Qualifying

Seeds

Qualifiers

Qualifying draw

First qualifier

Second qualifier

Third qualifier

Fourth qualifier

Fifth qualifier

Sixth qualifier

Seventh qualifier

References

External links
 Main draw
 Qualifying draw

Singles